First Congregational Church, or variations such as First Congregational Church, Former may refer to:

Alabama
First Congregational Church of Marion, listed on the National Register of Historic Places (NRHP)

Arizona
First Congregational Church and Parsonage (Prescott, Arizona), listed on the NRHP

California
First Congregational Church (Long Beach, California)
First Congregational Church of Los Angeles
First Congregational Church of Pescadero, listed on the NRHP
First Congregational Church (Porterville, California), listed on the NRHP
First Congregational Church of Riverside, listed on the NRHP
First Congregational Church (Riverside, California)
First Congregational Church of Sierra Madre

Colorado
First Congregational Church (Colorado Springs, Colorado), listed on the NRHP
First Congregational Church (Denver, Colorado), listed on the NRHP
First Congregational Church of Lyons, listed on the NRHP
First Congregational Church (Manitou Springs, Colorado), listed on the NRHP
First Congregational Church (Pueblo, Colorado), listed on the NRHP

Connecticut
First Congregational Church of Cheshire
First Congregational Church of East Hartford and Parsonage
First Congregational Church of East Haven
First Congregational Church of Plainfield

Georgia
First Congregational Church (Atlanta), listed on the NRHP

Illinois
First Congregational Church of Austin, listed on the NRHP
First Congregational Church (Des Plaines, Illinois), listed on the NRHP
First Congregational Church of LaMoille, listed on the NRHP
First Congregational Church (Marshall, Illinois), listed on the NRHP
First Congregational Church of Sterling
First Congregational Church of Western Springs, listed on the NRHP

Indiana
First Congregational Church of Michigan City, listed on the NRHP
First Congregational Church (Terre Haute, Indiana), listed on the NRHP

Iowa
First Congregational Church (Burlington, Iowa), listed on the NRHP
First Congregational Church (Davenport, Iowa)
First Congregational Church (Eldora, Iowa), listed on the NRHP
First Congregational Church (Garnavillo, Iowa), listed on the NRHP
First Congregational Church, Former (Sioux City, Iowa), listed on the NRHP

Kansas
First Congregational Church (Anthony, Kansas)
First Congregational Church (Fort Scott, Kansas), listed on the NRHP
First Congregational Church (Independence, Kansas), listed on the NRHP in Montgomery County
First Congregational Church (Manhattan, Kansas)

Maine
First Congregational Church of Buxton
First Congregational Church, United Church of Christ, Farmington
First Congregational Church and Parsonage (Kittery, Maine)
First Congregational Church (Pittston, Maine)
First Congregational Church, Former (Wells, Maine)

Massachusetts
First Congregational Church of Blandford
First Congregational Church of East Longmeadow
First Congregational Church of Hyde Park
First Congregational Church (Stoneham, Massachusetts)
First Congregational Parish Historic District, Truro
First Congregational Church (Waltham, Massachusetts)
First Congregational Church in Woburn

Michigan
First Congregational Church (Charlotte, Michigan), listed on the NRHP
First Congregational Church (Chelsea, Michigan), listed as a Michigan State Historic Site (MSHS)
First Congregational Church (Covert, Michigan), listed as a MSHS
First Congregational Church (Detroit), listed on the NRHP
First Congregational Church (Jackson, Michigan), listed on the NRHP and as a MSHS
First Congregational Church (Lake Linden, Michigan), listed on the NRHP
First Congregational Church (Lawrence, Michigan), listed as a MSHS
First Congregational Church (Manistee, Michigan), listed on the NRHP
Portland First Congregational Church, listed on the NRHP
First Congregational Church (Richmond, Michigan), listed on the NRHP
First Congregational Church (Union City, Michigan), listed as a MSHS
First Congregational Church (Vermontville, Michigan), listed on the NRHP

Minnesota
First Congregational Church of Clearwater, listed on the NRHP
First Congregational Church (Minneapolis, Minnesota)
First Congregational Church of Zumbrota

Nebraska
First Congregational Church, U.C.C. (Naponee, Nebraska), listed on the NRHP

New Hampshire
First Congregational Church (Alton, New Hampshire)
First Congregational Church of Boscawen
First Congregational Church (Farmington, New Hampshire)

New Jersey
First Congregational Church (Chester, New Jersey), listed on the NRHP

New York
First Congregational Church of Albany, listed on the NRHP
First Congregational Church of Bay Shore, listed on the NRHP
First Congregational Church (Berkshire, New York), listed on the NRHP
First Congregational Church and Cemetery, listed on the NRHP
First Congregational Church of Madrid, listed on the NRHP
First Congregational Church (Malone, New York), listed on the NRHP
First Congregational Church of Middletown, listed on the NRHP
First Congregational Church (Moravia, New York), NRHP-listed in Church Street-Congress Street Historic District
First Congregational Church of New Village, listed on the NRHP
First Congregational Church of Otto, listed on the NRHP
First Congregational Church and Society of Volney, listed on the NRHP

North Carolina
First Congregational Church (Mount Pleasant, North Carolina), listed on the NRHP

Ohio
First Congregational Church (Akron, Ohio), listed on the NRHP
First Congregational Church (Columbus, Ohio), listed on the Columbus Register of Historic Properties
First Congregational Church of Cuyahoga Falls, listed on the NRHP
First Congregational Church and Lexington School, listed on the NRHP
First Congregational Church (Marblehead, Ohio), listed on the NRHP
First Congregational Church (Sandusky, Ohio), listed on the NRHP

Oklahoma
First Congregational Church (Waynoka, Oklahoma), listed on the NRHP

Oregon
First Congregational Church (Corvallis, Oregon), listed on the NRHP
First Congregational Church (Eugene, Oregon), listed on the NRHP
First Congregational Church of Oregon City, listed on the NRHP
First Congregational Church (Portland, Oregon), listed on the NRHP

South Dakota
First Congregational Church of Milbank, listed on the NRHP
First Congregational Church (Rapid City, South Dakota), listed on the NRHP
First Congregational Church (Sioux Falls, South Dakota), listed on the NRHP
First Congregational Church (Turton, South Dakota), listed on the NRHP

Tennessee
First Congregational Church (Chattanooga, Tennessee), listed on the NRHP in Hamilton County
First Congregational Church and Parish House, listed on the NRHP

Utah
First Congregational Church (Salt Lake City, Utah)

Vermont
First Congregational Church of Bennington
First Congregational Church (Orwell, Vermont)
First Congregational Church of Swanton
First Congregational Church and Meetinghouse, Townshend

Washington
First Congregational Church of Spokane, listed on the NRHP

Wisconsin
First Congregational Church (Beloit, Wisconsin), listed on the NRHP
Community House, First Congregational Church, listed on the NRHP
First Congregational Church (Hartland, Wisconsin), listed on the NRHP
First Congregational Church (Platteville, Wisconsin), listed on the NRHP
First Congregational Church (Ripon, Wisconsin), listed on the NRHP
First Congregational Church (Waukesha, Wisconsin), listed on the NRHP

See also
List of Congregational churches
Congregational church (disambiguation)